Helmut Schreiber (16 November 1925 – 10 February 1995) was a German actor. He appeared in more than ninety films from 1954 to 1988.

Selected filmography

References

External links 

1925 births
1995 deaths
German male film actors